Odeefuo Boaponsem was a traditional ruler in Ghana and Paramount Chief of Denkyira in the Central Region. His official title was Denkyirahene - King of Denkyira. He was the ninth president of the National House of Chiefs and served from 1999 to 2001.

References 

Ghanaian leaders
People from Central Region (Ghana)